Minisztár was a Hungarian pop group formed in 2005 and consisting of Georgina ('Gina') Polyákovics, Vivien Gonda and Márkó ('Márk') Takács. The band has released two albums to date, as well as a video DVD, before disbanding in the summer of 2007. The group is one of many to cover the popular song Dragostea Din Tei.

Discography
 Minisztár (2005)
 Minidiszkó (2006)

Track list
 Minisztâr (2005)

 Minidiszkó (2006)

DVD releases
 Mini tánc (2006)

See also
 "Dragostea Din Tei"

References

External links
 Talent Studio article about Minisztár (Hungarian)
 Minisztár's cover of "Dragostea Din Tei"

Musical groups established in 2000
Hungarian pop music groups